The first season of the animated series WordGirl premiered on September 3, 2007, which was originally broadcast on PBS in the United States until January 2, 2009. The first season contained 26 episodes (52 11-minute segments).

Cast 
 Dannah Phirman: Becky Botsford/Wordgirl, Claire McCallister, Chuck's Mom, Edith Von Hoosinghaus, Pretty Princess.
 Chris Parnell: Narrator, Henchmen #1, Museum Security Guard, Exposition Guy, Mazo-Racer Driver
 James Adomian: Bob/Captain Huggy Face, Candlestick Maker, Timmy Tim-Bo.
 Jack D. Ferraiolo: The Butcher.
 Fred Stoller: Chuck the Evil Sandwich Making Guy.
 Cree Summer: Granny May.
 Patton Oswalt: Theodore “Tobey” McCallister III, Robots.
 Tom Kenny: Dr. Two-Brains, TJ Botsford, Warden Chalmers.
 Jeffrey Tambor: Mr. Big.
 John C. McGinley: The Whammer.
 Stephanie Sheh: Lil Mitten.
 Maria Bamford: Violet Heaslip, Sally Botsford, Leslie.
 Ryan Raddatz: Todd “Scoops” Ming, Tim Botsford, Gold Store Dealer.
 Larry Murphy: The Amazing Rope Guy, Reporter Stu Brisket, Zookeeper.
 Jen Cohn: Rich Old Lady, Female Bank Tellers, Ms. Champlain, Ms. Libri.
 Ron Lynch: The Mayor.
 H. Jon Benjamin: Reginald the Jewelry Store Clerk.
 Mike O’Connell: Grocery Store Manager, Big Left Hand Guy, User Car Salesman.

Episodes
* - This episode's segments did not use verbal instructions to listen for two words that would be used throughout.
** - This episode is listed as a season 1 episode although it premiered during the second season.

References

2007 American television seasons
2008 American television seasons
2009 American television seasons
WordGirl seasons